Tevita Mafileo (born 4 February 1998, in New Zealand) is a New Zealand rugby union player who plays for the  in Super Rugby. His playing position is prop. He has named in the Hurricanes squad in 2020.

Reference list

External links
Ultimate Rugby profile

1998 births
New Zealand rugby union players
Living people
Rugby union props
Bay of Plenty rugby union players
Chiefs (rugby union) players
Hurricanes (rugby union) players
Rugby union players from Auckland